South Fork Eagle River is a  tributary of the Eagle River in Eagle County, Colorado. The river flows from a source east of Tennessee Pass in the White River National Forest to a confluence with the East Fork Eagle River that forms the Eagle River.

See also
 List of rivers of Colorado
 List of tributaries of the Colorado River

References

Rivers of Eagle County, Colorado
Rivers of Colorado
Tributaries of the Colorado River in Colorado